Arnaud  may refer to:

People
 Arnaud (given name) or Arnauld (formerly Arnoul), the French form of the German given name Arnold
 Arnaud (surname) or Arnauld (formerly Arnoul), the French form of the name Arnold
 Arnauld family, a noble French family prominent in the 17th century, associated with Jansenism

Places
 Arnaud, Nippes, a commune in Haiti
 Arnaud River (formerly known as the Payne River), a river in Nunavik, Quebec, Canada

Other uses 
 Arnaud's, a well known restaurant in New Orleans, Louisiana, U.S.
 Saint Arnaud (disambiguation)

See also
 Arnie (disambiguation)
 Arnold (disambiguation)